Salustiano Contreras "Salud" Saavedra was a Cuban baseball infielder in the Cuban League. He played from 1901 to 1907 with several clubs, including San Francisco, Club Fé, Carmelita, Azul, and Habana.

References

External links

Year of birth missing
Cuban League players
Cuban baseball players
Club Fé players
Carmelita players
Habana players
San Francisco (baseball) players
Year of death unknown